Limnephilus externus is a species of northern caddisfly in the family Limnephilidae. It is found in North America and Europe.

References

Integripalpia
Articles created by Qbugbot
Insects described in 1861